Planet of da Apes is the second and final studio album by American hip hop group Da Lench Mob. The group's final album, it was released on November 1, 1994, via Street Knowledge/Priority Records. Its title is a reference to Planet of the Apes. Audio production was handled by Ice Cube, Mr. Woody, Dr. Jam, Madness 4 Real, Quincy Jones III, and 88 X Unit. It featured guest appearances from K-Dee, Mack 10 and Yo-Yo. The album peaked at number 81 on the Billboard 200.

Production
J-Dee's vocals were erased from the album after he went to prison. Maulkie, of Yomo & Maulkie, was brought in as his replacement.

Critical reception
Trouser Press wrote that the album "is no match for its predecessor’s focused fury."

Track listing 

Sample credits
Track 3 contains elements from "Slow Down" by Brand Nubian (1990)
Track 4 contains elements from "Hit It Run" by Run-DMC (1986), "Get Up Offa That Thing" by James Brown (1976), "Mean Old Lady" by King Biscuit Boy (1974)
Track 7 contains elements from "Guerillas in Tha Mist" by Da Lench Mob (1992) and "911 Is a Joke" by Public Enemy (1990)
Track 8 contains elements from "Hollywood Squares" by Bootsy's Rubber Band (1978) and "Doo Wa Ditty (Blow That Thing)" by Zapp (1982)
Track 9 contains elements from "Guerillas in Tha Mist" by Da Lench Mob (1992)
Track 10 contains elements from "Kool Is Back" by Funk, Inc. (1971)

Personnel

Terry "T-Bone" Gray – vocals, co-producer
Jerome "Shorty" Muhammad – vocals
Mark Eric "Maulkie" Green – vocals
O'Shea Jackson – vocals (tracks: 3, 8), producer (tracks: 1, 3, 5, 8, 10), executive producer
Dedrick D'Mon Rolison – vocals (track 3)
Darrel Johnson – vocals (track 8)
Yolanda Whitaker – vocals (track 9)
Henrik Milling – vocals (track 6), producer (tracks: 6, 7)
Quincy Jones III – keyboards & producer (track 9)
Michael Keith Simmons – guitar (track 2), producer (track 11)
Victor Nathan Taylor – guitar (track 2), producer (track 11)
Darryl "D Funk" Fisher – keyboards (track 2), piano (track 12)
Mike "Crazy Neck" Sims – bass & guitar (track 6)
Bootsy Collins – bass (track 8)
Gary James – guitar (tracks: 8, 12), keyboards (track 8)
Stan “The Guitar Man” Jones – guitar (track 9)
Clint "Payback" Sands – guitar (track 10)
DJ Inz – scratches (track 7)
Keston E. Wright – engineering & mixing
Rob Chiarelli – engineering & mixing
Joseph L. Steiner III – mastering
Jamie Seyberth – mixing
Charlie Essers – mixing
Kevin Wright – mixing

References

External links 

1994 albums
G-funk albums
Da Lench Mob albums
Political music albums by American artists